Esperanza Perez Padilla (born May 28, 1964), known professionally as Zsa Zsa Padilla, is a Filipino actress and singer from the Philippines. As a vocalist, she has performed in prestigious local and international stages.

Personal life

Family
Padilla was born as Esperanza Perez Padilla in 1964, the daughter of parents Esperanza "Kating" Felipa Perez and actor-sportsman Carlos "Sonny" Padilla, Jr. She has three daughters, namely Karylle with Modesto Tatlonghari; and Zia and Nicole with Dolphy Quizon.

Career
Padilla started in the mid-70s as the vocalist of the Manila Sound band, Hotdog, and then went solo in 1982. In 1987, she had her first TV acting role in the series, Lovingly Yours, Helen. In the same year, she had her first movie role in the film, Mga Anak ni Facifica Falayfay, with the Filipino comedian Dolphy, who became her partner of more than 20 years.

Discography

Albums

Singles

The Analog Era

The Digital Era

Filmography

Film

Television

Awards

References

External links
Official Website

1964 births
Living people
Zsa Zsa
20th-century Filipino actresses
21st-century Filipino actresses
Filipino film actresses
Filipino television actresses
Filipino women comedians
Manila sound musicians
PolyEast Records artists
20th-century Filipino women singers
21st-century Filipino women singers
GMA Network personalities
ABS-CBN personalities
Filipino television variety show hosts